Leilehua High School is a public, co-educational, college preparatory high school in Wahiawa, Hawaii on the island of Oahu. It is part of the Hawaii State Department of Education, nationally recognized as a Blue Ribbon School by the United States Department of Education, and fully accredited by the Western Association of Schools and Colleges (WASC). The school was first established in 1924, when Hawaii was still a territory and located close to present day Schofield Barracks. The graduating class of 1928 totaled 15 students, all dependents of military personnel. It relocated to its present  campus in the historic town of Wahiawa in 1949.  The layout of the Leilehua facility was designed to represent openness, tranquility, and harmony with the environment. Buildings of an older vintage are blended among an abundance of trees and greenery.  The campus boasts sculptures by Satoru Abe, Bumpei Akaji, Claude Horan, Rick Mills, Jacob Sakaguchi, and Ken Shutt.

Approximately 25% of the student body are from military families stationed at Schofield Barracks, Wheeler Army Airfield, and NCTAMS PAC (U.S. Navy) in Whitmore Village.

History

1949: The Schofield High and Grammar School and Leilehua High School were combined and built on its present 32 acre (129,000 m²) site.

1973: Leilehua won its first state basketball championship under coach Richard Townsend. The roster included Rick Wagner, who later played at football at the University of Hawaiʻi.

1984: Leilehua won its first Oahu Prep Bowl under coach Hugh Yoshida. Leilehua defeated Saint Louis 10-0.

1993: Leilehua was selected as a Nationally Recognized School of Excellence.

1996: Leilehua earned a maximum six-year term of accreditation from the Western Association of Schools and Colleges (WASC).

2004: Leilehua High School named its stadium after its former football coach Hugh Yoshida.

2007: Leilehua won its first HHSAA Football Championship under coach Nolan Tokuda. Leilehua defeated Saint Louis 20-16.

2007, 2008: Cross Country coach Shawn Nakata led the Mules to back-to-back state titles with the help of Bryce Jenkins (the school's top runner/individual state champion).

2011: Cross Country coach Shawn Nakata made history having the first undefeated team in state history. The team was led by Elliot Estrada (state runner up) Dylan Martinez, Brandon Miya, Christopher Olverson, Joshua Castro and Freshmen brother Jordan Castro who later became the OIA 3000m champion and holder of several state records on the JV level.

Student body

Athletics

Sports

Athletic venues

Championships

Leilehua Mules football

The Leilehua Mules varsity football team is a Division I team representing the OIA Red conference, West Division. Nolan Tokuda has served as the team's head coach since 2004. The Mules have won two Division I titles in 1984 and 2007. The Leilehua football program has produced a number of NFL players such as Adrian Murrell, Al Harris, and Lauvale Sape (see notable alumni).

Rivalries

Mililani Trojans, Cross-Town Rival (Main)
Waianae Seariders
Radford Rams, Unity Bowl (Army vs. Navy)

Coaches and history

Marching Band 
The Leilehua High School Marching Band and Color Guard was formed in 2006 under the direction of Alan Kinoshita and had been under his direction until 2017. From 2018 the marching band has been under the direction of Aladdin Roque-Dangaran. the At its largest, the band grew to include approximately 120 members composing of wind instruments, percussion, and color guard. Since its debut in 2006, the band has been able to grow and evolve from the "Class Single A(A)" division in 2006, through "Class Double A(AA)”, and "Class Triple A(AAA)" in 2013.  Additionally, the band has had the wonderful opportunity to perform for the Tenri Kyoko Gakuen High School band in Japan multiple times. The band's motto is F.I.R.E is an acronym which stands for: Focus, Intensity, Respect, and Excitement. Students are taught to instill these principles not only within the band room, but also as they go out into the world post-graduation. The Leilehua High School Marching Band has been able to compete and place with top schools including: Mililani, Moanalua, and Maui High Schools. Leilehua has also been able to place consistently high in nearly every major category within their respective division. 

 Information used in this table is from the last competition from that year
 The festival rating judges the show as a whole from Good, Excellent, to Superior.
 Divisions are based on the number of students in a given band Single A(A) with up to approximately 60 members, Double A(AA) with up to approximately 80 members, and Triple A(AAA) anything larger than 100 members.
 There may be a few exceptions with how a band is placed into a category at the discretion of the marching band council.

Notable alumni

Ray Austin,  NFL player
Errol M. Kealii Blaisdell (Errol Aken), Traditional Hawaiian Entertainer, Multiple Hoku Award Finalist & Songwriter
Robert Bunda, Hawaii state senator
Paul Dombroski, NFL player
Al Harris, NFL player
Martin Iosefo, professional rugby player with the United States national rugby team
Scott Loucks, MLB player (Houston Astros, Pittsburgh Pirates)
Bryant Moniz, Hawaii Warriors quarterback
Adrian Murrell, NFL player
Marcus Oshiro, Hawaii state representative
Lauvale Sape, NFL player
Elmelindo Rodrigues Smith, Sergeant First Class, U.S. Army; Medal of Honor recipient
Antonio Taguba, the second Filipino-American U.S. Army general
Joyce Sachiko Tsunoda, University of Hawaii community colleges administrator
Charles Tuaau, NFL player
Corinne K. A. Watanabe, judge

Filmography
LOST - Leilehua High School appeared in the TV hit series LOST as "Cowan Heights."

References

External links
Leilehua High School Official Website
Leilehua High School Alumni Website
MulesRule.com (school photo gallery)

Educational institutions established in 1924
Public high schools in Honolulu County, Hawaii
1924 establishments in Hawaii